Roll with the Punches is the 37th studio album by Northern Irish singer-songwriter Van Morrison, released on 22 September 2017 by Caroline Records. It features Jeff Beck on guitar, and charted in the Top 10 in five countries, and the Top 40 in a further six, including the US. 

Great guests on this album, Jeff Beck on electric guitar, Georgie Fame on Hammond organ and vocals, Paul Moran also on Hammond organ and trumpet, Paul Jones on harmonica and vocals and, last but not least, Chris Farlowe on vocals.

Background and launch
The album consists of five original songs and ten covers. The cover originally featured former professional wrestler and Mohawk chief Billy Two Rivers, who sued the singer and the label, Universal Music Group, claiming that they did not seek permission to use his likeness. The parties agreed to settle out of court, and the cover was replaced, to feature Omagh boxer William Mitchell.

On 25 September, Morrison spoke to Paul Jones - who is a guest musician on the album - on his BBC Radio 2 show to coincide with its release.  When Morrison received the Lifetime Achievement Award for Songwriting from Emmylou Harris at the 2017 Americana Music Honors & Awards ceremony, he performed "Transformation", from the album. He has said that the inspiration for the song came from encountering the Californian Christian community, Agape.

Critical reception
Pitchfork says that Roll with the Punches is "a thorough exploration of the blues", the first time Morrison has dedicated an entire album to that genre. Hailing it as "crisp, precise", it "reveals [Morrison's] ability to inhabit classic songs while paying respect to their form." Slate finds that it "plays like a party album", and in departing from "his trademark blend of jazz, folk, and Celtic soul" is Morrison's "most distinctive album since 2006’s country covers collection Pay the Devil".

Track listing

Personnel
Credits adapted from AllMusic.

Musicians

Van Morrison – vocals, electric guitar, harmonica, percussion, saxophone
Jeff Beck – electric guitar (2-4, 8, 9)
Ned Edwards – electric guitar, harmonica, background vocals
Dave Keary – acoustic and electric guitar, background vocals
Pete Hurley – electric bass
Laurence Cottle – electric bass, trombone
Paul Moore – electric bass
Chris Hill – double bass
Jason Rebello – piano
Stuart McIlroy – piano, vocals, harmonica 
Joseph Jordan-Richardson - Organ, Piano, pig skin drums
Paul Moran – Hammond organ, trumpet
Georgie Fame – Hammond organ, vocals (5, 11)
Chris Farlowe – vocals (2-4, 9)
Paul Jones – harmonica, vocals (6)
Sumudu Jayatilaka – background vocals
Dana Masters – background vocals
Elizabeth Williams – background vocals
Mez Clough – drums, percussion, background vocals
James Powell – drums
Colin Griffin – drums
Dan Ellis – percussion

Technical

Dick Beetham – mastering
Poppy Kavanagh – assistant engineer
Rowan McIntosh – assistant engineer
Gerry McLernon – engineer, mixing
Phil Parsons – assistant engineer
Patrick Phillips – assistant engineer
Tristan Powell – engineer, mixing
Will Purton – assistant, assistant engineer, engineer, mixing
Matt Tait – engineer, mixing
Richard Wade – photography
Enda Walsh – engineer, mixing

Charts

Weekly charts

Year-end charts

References

External links
 

2017 albums
Caroline Records albums
Van Morrison albums
Albums produced by Van Morrison